Natasha's Story is a 1994 book by war correspondent Michael Nicholson and is based on his work for the British news broadcaster, ITN. Deeply shocked about the catastrophic situation of 200 orphaned children in Bosnia and Herzegovina, Nicholson adopted a girl, Natasha, under adventurous circumstances and gave her a new home in England.

The film Welcome to Sarajevo is based on it.

References
 Natasha's Story by Michael Nicholson (London: Pan in association with Macmillan, 1994). .

1994 non-fiction books
Siege of Sarajevo in non-fiction
Non-fiction books about the Bosnian War
Cultural depictions of Bosnia and Herzegovina people